Anton Sergeyevich Kozlov (born 2 June 1988) is a Russian former professional football player.

Club career
He played for the main squad of FC Saturn Ramenskoye in the Russian Cup and UEFA Intertoto Cup 2008.

He played 6 seasons in the Russian Football National League for 6 different teams.

International career
Kozlov was a part of the Russia U-21 side that was competing in the 2011 European Under-21 Championship qualification.

References

External links
 
 

1988 births
People from Bratsk
Living people
Russian footballers
Russia under-21 international footballers
Association football midfielders
FC Saturn Ramenskoye players
FC Khimki players
FC Baltika Kaliningrad players
FC Nizhny Novgorod (2007) players
FC Luch Vladivostok players
FC Dynamo Saint Petersburg players
FC Tom Tomsk players
FC Avangard Kursk players
FC Sever Murmansk players
FC Mika players
Russian expatriate footballers
Expatriate footballers in Armenia
Armenian Premier League players
Sportspeople from Irkutsk Oblast